The thirteenth convocation of the National Assembly of the Republic of Serbia is the current convocation of the National Assembly of Serbia, elected in the 2022 general election.

Leadership 
At the first session of the National Assembly of the 13th convocation on 2 August 2022, Vladimir Orlić, a member of the Serbian Progressive Party (SNS), was elected chairman. Out of the 230 present, 154 MPs supported Orlić's candidacy, while 76 were against.

Seven vice-presidents of the assembly were also elected: Sandra Božić (SNS), Snežana Paunović (SPS), Borko Stefanović (SSP), Zoran Lutovac (DS), Božidar Delić (NN-IJS), Elvira Kovač (VMSZ) and Usame Zukorlić (SPP). Vice Chairman Božidar Delić died a few weeks after being elected.

Current composition

References 

2022 establishments
National Assembly of Serbia
National Assembly (Serbia)